Gerald Mars (born 1933) is a British social anthropologist who works across disciplines to understand the nature and problems of modern industrial society. His work draws on the grid-group theory of Mary Douglas, on his fieldwork in Canada, Britain, Israel, and the former Soviet republics, and on his own experience. His work has often centred on workplace crime, and his best-known book, still often discussed, is Cheats at Work (1982).

Born Gerald Margolis in Manchester, the eldest of four brothers in a Jewish family, he grew up in Blackpool where, leaving school at 15, he worked at stalls on the Golden Mile and Pleasure Beach. After National Service and varied employment he was admitted in 1959 under the mature students' state scholarship scheme to Pembroke College, Cambridge, where his bemused tutor was the classicist W. A. Camps. In 1972 he gained a doctorate in anthropology at London School of Economics, supervised by Raymond Firth, having done fieldwork in 1962-1964 (hosted by the Memorial University of Newfoundland) among the dockers of St John's, Newfoundland. His title was An Anthropological Study of Longshoremen and of Industrial Relations in the Port of St John's, Newfoundland, Canada. From 1966 to 1984 he was a lecturer at Middlesex Polytechnic, then briefly at the Polytechnic of East London. In 1974 he helped to set up the first British campus of what is now ESCP Europe.  Retiring from full-time teaching he became a professor at the schools of management and policy studies at Cranfield with part-time professorships at several other universities. For seventeen years he was a part-time consultant at the Tavistock Institute of Human Relations. In 2003 he was awarded the Lucy Mair Medal by the Royal Anthropological Institute. Since 2008 he has been honorary professor of anthropology at University College London, and since 2010 visiting professor of organisational ethnography at Suffolk Business School.

In Becoming an Anthropologist: A Memoir and a Guide to Anthropology he shows how his childhood experiences among Jews and Christians in Manchester, his work at fairground stalls in Blackpool and his National Service in the Royal Air Force steered him towards anthropology. His research at St John's, Newfoundland, at the difficult moment when traditional working practices among longshoremen were doomed to change, impelled him to explore the hidden and unofficial culture of those who work in highly regulated organizations. Soon afterwards he undertook an exploration of the black economy—the real economy—of the Soviet republics. He has applied the discipline of social anthropology and extended its methodologies to criminology (particularly workplace crime and sabotage), the economic and social effects of long wave economic cycles, occupational theory and the hotel and tourism industry: the latter was the focus of his jointly authored work The World of Waiters (1984) and of several later studies. Mars is thus one of relatively few scholars who have employed Mary Douglas's neo-Durkheimian Cultural Theory ("grid-group theory") in work on organizations and have gone on to apply its insights to business management. His highly innovative study Cheats at Work is frequently cited and discussed.

He has published a collective volume and a number of papers on the anthropology of food, several of them co-authored with his wife, the food historian Valerie Mars. They are both frequent participants at the Oxford Food Symposium.

Major writings 
 1976 (with P. Mitchell) : Room for Reform? A case study on industrial relations in the hotel industry. Open University Press
 1979 (with D. Bryant, P. Mitchell) : Manpower Problems in Hotels and Restaurants. Saxon House
 1982 : Cheats at Work: an anthropology of workplace crime. Allen & Unwin
 1983 (with Y. Altman) : "How a Soviet Economy Really Works" in M. Clarke, ed., Corruption. Frances Pinter
 1984 (with Michael Nicod) : The World of Waiters: an anthropology of an occupation. Allen & Unwin
 1986 (with Y. Altman) : "The Cultural Bases of Soviet Central Asia's Second Economy" in Central Asian Survey vol. 5 no. 3/4
 1988 : "Hidden Hierarchies in Israeli Kibbutzim" in J. G. Flanagan, S. Rayner, eds, Rules, Decisions and Inequality in Egalitarian Societies (Aldershot: Avebury) pp. 98–112
 1993 (editor, with Valerie Mars) : Food, Culture, and History: proceedings of the London Food Seminar
 2000 (editor) : Risk Management. 2 vols. Ashgate
 2001 (editor) : Workplace Sabotage. Ashgate
 2001 (editor) : Occupational Crime. Ashgate
 2003 (with Mary Douglas) : "Terrorism: a positive feedback game" in Human Relations vol. 56 pp. 763–786
 2008 : "Food, Family and Tradition in North Italy: the rise and fall of a Michelin-starred family restaurant" in David Berris, David Sutton, eds., The Restaurants Book: ethnographies of where people eat. Berg
 2008 (editor with Perri 6) : The Institutional Dynamics of Culture: the new Durkheimians. 2 vols. Ashgate
 2013 : Locating Deviance: crime, change, and organizations. Ashgate
 2015 : Becoming an Anthropologist: A Memoir and a Guide to Anthropology [autobiographical]

Notes and references 

 Yochanan Altman, ed., "Advances in cultural theory: in honour of Gerald Mars". Special section in Journal of Organizational Change Management vol. 28 no. 5 (2015). Contains 5 papers:
 Y. Altman, "Editorial: Advances in cultural theory: in honour of Gerald Mars" Online free access
 Taran Patel, "Crossing disciplinary, epistemological and conceptual boundaries in search of better cultural sense-making tools", pp. 728–748
 Y. Altman, Claudio Morrison, "Informal economic relations and organizations",  pp. 749–769
 Perri 6, "Quiet unintended transitions? Neo-Durkheimian explanation of institutional change",  pp. 770–790
 Ikechukwu Umejesi, Michael Thompson, "Fighting elephants, suffering grass: oil exploitation in Nigeria", pp. 791–811
 Gerald Mars, Becoming an Anthropologist. Newcastle: Cambridge Scholars Publishing, 2015. 
 Edward W. Sieh, "Employee Theft: an examination of Gerald Mars and an explanation based on equity theory" in Freda Adler, William S. Laufer, eds., New Directions in Criminological Theory (New Brunswick: Transaction Publishers, 1993) pp. 95–111
 L. Thornthwaite, P. McGraw, "Still 'Staying Loose in a Tightening World?' Revisiting Gerald Mars' Cheats at Work" in Alison Barnes, Lucy Taksa, eds., Rethinking Misbehaviour and Resistance in Organizations (Emerald Group Publishing, 2012) pp. 29–56

External links 
 Gerald Mars: biographical page at Cambridge Scholars Publishing

Living people
1933 births
British anthropologists
British Jews
British criminologists
Memorial University of Newfoundland alumni
Academics of Middlesex University
Academics of the University of East London
Academics of Cranfield University
Alumni of Pembroke College, Cambridge
Alumni of the London School of Economics